Chekira may refer to:

 Chekira Lockhart Hypolite, Dominican politician
 Chekira Airfield, an abandoned airfield in Tunisia

See also 
 Chakira (disambiguation)
 Shakira (disambiguation)